Lindsey J. Smith was a member of the Wisconsin State Assembly.

Biography
Smith was born on January 8, 1840, in what is now Lafayette, Walworth County, Wisconsin. During the American Civil War, he enlisted with the Union Army. He achieved the rank of captain with the 28th Wisconsin Volunteer Infantry Regiment. Conflicts Smith participated in include the Battle of Helena and the Battle of Spanish Fort.

Assembly career
Smith was a member of the Assembly in 1881. He was an Independent Republican.

References

People from Walworth County, Wisconsin
Members of the Wisconsin State Assembly
Wisconsin Republicans
Wisconsin Independents
People of Wisconsin in the American Civil War
Union Army officers
Union Army soldiers
1840 births
Year of death missing